Piotr Szulkin (26 April 1950 – 3 August 2018) was a Polish film director and writer. He directed over thirty films, both Polish and international productions. He was a recipient of "Best Science Fiction Film Director" at Eurocon in 1984. During the latter part of his career, he was also a professor at the National Film School in Łódź.

Personal life

In 2013, Piotr Szulkin demanded the removal of information about the Jewish ancestry of Paweł Szulkin in his biography in the Polski Słownik Biograficzny (Polish National Dictionary). After Piotr Szulkin sued Polski Słownik Biograficzny, in January 2014, the Civil Court in Kraków, as a protective action, put a one-year prohibition on the dissemination of the volume of Polski Słownik Biograficzny including the biography of Paweł Szulkin.

Szulkin was married to Renata Karwowska.

Films directed
1975 Dziewce z ciortom
1977 Oczy uroczne
1978 Kobiety pracujące
1980 Golem
1981 Wojna światów – następne stulecie (The War of the Worlds: Next Century)
1984 O-Bi, O-Ba. Koniec cywilizacji
1985 Ga, Ga. Chwała bohaterom
1990 Femina
1993 Mięso (Ironica)
2003 Ubu Król

Scripts written
1972 Raz, dwa, trzy
1972 Wszystko
1974 Przed kamerą SBB
1975 Zespół SBB
1975 Narodziny
1976 Życie codzienne
1977 Oczy uroczne
1980 Golem
1981 Wojna światów - Następne stulecie
1984 O-Bi, O-Ba. Koniec cywilizacji
1985 Ga, Ga. Chwała bohaterom
1993 Mięso (Ironica)
2003 Ubu Król

Actor
1978 Szpital przemienienia (as Jakub)
1986 Kołysanka (Lullaby, A (The Lullabye)
1985 Képvadászok
1989 Lawa jako Diabeł I
1992 Kiedy rozum śpi

References

External links

Piotr Szulkin at culture.pl

1950 births
2018 deaths
Łódź Film School alumni
Polish people of Jewish descent
Polish film directors
Polish screenwriters
Film people from Gdańsk